SLC-2 may refer to:

SLC-2 Radar - a military defence radar system.
Vandenberg AFB Space Launch Complex 2 - a rocket launch pad at Vandenberg Air Force Base